Lyman F. Sheats Jr (March 24, 1966 – January 19, 2022) was an American pinball champion, game designer and coin-operated game operating system software engineer who had worked for Bally, Williams, and Stern Pinball, among other companies.

Biography
Lyman Sheats first came to prominence in the world of pinball as a player in 1993, when he claimed the overall championship at PAPA 3, the tournament presented by the Professional and Amateur Pinball Association. He would also win the championship in 1996 (PAPA 7) and 2004 (PAPA 9). Lyman also won the European Pinball Championship in 2007. He was an active player in several Chicago area pinball leagues and won numerous local championships. Lyman was considered to be one of the greatest pinball players of all time.

Lyman began his career in the early 1990s at Data East where he worked on the game and dot matrix display programming for The Last Action Hero (1993), Guns N' Roses (1994), and The Who's Tommy Pinball Wizard (1994). After Data East Pinball became Sega Pinball, he was recruited by Williams/Bally (Now WMS Industries) to program its pinball machines.

His first game for Bally/Midway was Attack From Mars which he programmed with designer Brian Eddy. Lyman and Brian again teamed up on the very popular Medieval Madness produced by Williams in 1997.

Lyman worked with designer George Gomez to program Monster Bash, which was produced by Williams in 1998. Monster Bash has a “Lyman’s Lament” Easter Egg, accessed through a series of right and left flipper sequences. If done correctly, a recording of Lyman saying “Totally” is announced by the game. The game has different music in this mode, and Lyman's voice comments on various things as you play. Lyman had certain special modes hidden in a few of the games that he programmed documented in “Cheat Sheet” pages on Reddit.

He was involved in Williams’s Pinball 2000 project through October 1999 when Williams closed its pinball division to concentrate on other gaming machines such as slot machines and video games. After a few years of programming video games at Midway Games, Lyman rejoined the pinball arena when Gary Stern hired him in 2003 at the newly-renamed Stern Pinball. Shortly after being hired by Stern, Lyman teamed up with fellow ex-Williams employee Steve Ritchie to work on a series of blockbuster games such as Spider-Man (2007) and AC/DC (2012, 2018). Lyman also reunited with George Gomez to create the Batman: The Dark Knight (pinball) game produced by Stern Pinball in 2008.

In later years, Lyman worked with the team that updated the rule sets for The Walking Dead (2014) and Batman '66 (2016) games that were produced by Stern Pinball.

Personal life
Lyman was a coffee enthusiast and roasted his custom blend of coffee beans in a cast iron pan on his stovetop.

Death
Lyman F. Sheats Jr. died in Hoffman Estates, Illinois, the evening of January 19, 2022, at 55. The official cause of death is listed as suicide.

References

1966 births
2022 deaths
2022 suicides
American designers
Artists from Chicago
Artists from Colorado
Pinball game designers
Suicides in Illinois